The 1974 1. divisjon was the 30th completed season of Norway's first-tier football league and was contested by 12 teams. The season was won by Viking, one point ahead of the newly promoted team Molde. This was Viking third consecutive league championship, and the fourth total. HamKam, Sarpsborg and Raufoss was relegated to the 1975 2. divisjon.

Team changes from 1973
Frigg, Lyn and Fredrikstad was relegated from the 1973 Norwegian First Division, and was replaced by Sarpsborg and Molde who won their 1973 2. divisjon groups, in addition to Vålerengen who won the promotion play-off against Bryne and Mjølner.

Season summary
Molde, who were playing in the top-flight for the first time since the 1957–58 season, won their three first matches and were leading the league in 9 of 22 rounds. Molde were in the lead with three matches left to play, despite a 0–2 loss at home against Viking, but when Vålerengen won 4–3 against Molde after a match-winning goal from Terje Olsen in the next match, Viking was the top of the league. Before the last match, Viking was leading one point ahead of Molde, and they won their third consecutive championship after they beat Strømsgodset in the last match. Viking had the opportunity to win the double, but lost the 1974 Norwegian Football Cup final 3–1 against Skeid.

Viking's goalkeeper, Erik Johannessen kept a clean sheet for 672 minutes during the season, which was a Norwegian record for 32 years until Sondre Rossbach of Odd played 730 minutes without conceding a goal in 2016. Molde's Odd Berg became the top goalscorer in the league with 13 goals.

HamKam, Sarpsborg and Raufoss were relegated at the end of the season. This was HamKam's first relegation from the top league, and the club has later been relegated eight times, which is a Norwegian record. Sarpsborg FK had previously been one of the big clubs in Norway, but their spell in the top-flight in 1974 was their last, and for the next 36 years the town of Sarpsborg did not have a first-tier team until Sarpsborg 08 played in Tippeligaen in the 2011 season. Raufoss, who did not win a match until the 20th round, has not been able to play in the top league again.

Teams and locations
''Note: Table lists in alphabetical order.

League table

Results

Season statistics

Top scorer
 Odd Berg, Molde – 13 goals

Attendances

References

Eliteserien seasons
Norway
Norway
1